Alfonso López Pumarejo Airport  is a domestic airport serving the city of Valledupar, Colombia, and also serving as a small Colombian Air Force and Colombian Police air base. The airport is operated by Aerocivil. Three commercial passenger airlines as well as two cargo airlines serve the airport, the passenger airlines being LATAM Colombia, EasyFly and Avianca.

Airlines and destinations

See also
Transport in Colombia
List of airports in Colombia

References

External links
Valledupar Airport at OurAirports

Valledupar Airport at FallingRain

Airports in Colombia
Valledupar
Buildings and structures in Cesar Department